Francisco Aranda Millán (14 October 1881, in Villarroya de la Sierra – 20 July 1937) was a Spanish zoologist. He was executed during the Spanish Civil War by a fascist squadron in Valdemorillo. He was the father of film critic and Surrealist author Jose Francisco Aranda (1925-1989).

References

1881 births
1937 deaths
People from Comunidad de Calatayud
20th-century Spanish zoologists
Spanish people of the Spanish Civil War (Republican faction)
People executed by Francoist Spain
Executed Spanish people